Greenwich is a suburban area of Ipswich, in the Ipswich district, in the county of Suffolk, England. For many years it was a hamlet included in the parish of St Clement's and thus was part of the Ipswich Corporation from the time of its creation in 1200.

Prominent buildings in Greenwich
 Cliff Quay Power Station (commissioned 1949, demolished 1994)

References

 
Ipswich Districts